João Vicente Barbosa da Silva de Castro (born March 27, 1983) is a Brazilian actor and comedian, famous for being one of the founding members of the video production company Porta dos Fundos.

Biography
João Vicente de Castro was born in Rio de Janeiro, on March 27, 1983. His mother, Gilda Midani (born Gilda Barbosa da Silva), is a wardrobe stylist, and his father, Tarso de Castro, was a journalist famous for being one of the founders of the popular newspaper O Pasquim. He also has a half-sister, Ana Dantas. Castro graduated in advertising and for a while exercised his profession in São Paulo, before discovering his vocation for acting. In 2012 he founded Porta dos Fundos alongside Gregório Duvivier, Fábio Porchat, Ian SBF and Antonio Tabet. Castro's first venture into television was also in 2012, portraying himself in the miniseries O Fantástico Mundo de Gregório by Multishow. In 2013 he reached higher fame after starring as Liosvaldo in the International Emmy-nominated TV series A Mulher do Prefeito, which was broadcast by Rede Globo. In the following year he portrayed Reinaldo in Lili, a Ex, broadcast by GNT. From 2015 to 2016 he portrayed Walter in Fox's O Grande Gonzalez, and from 2016 to 2017 portrayed Lázaro Vasconcelos in the telenovela Rock Story.

In 2014 Castro starred in his first full-length film, A Noite da Virada, directed by Fábio Mendonça, portraying Rica. In 2016 he voiced the character José Tequila in the Portuguese-language dub of the animated film Sausage Party, in his first stint as a voice actor.

Since June 2015 Castro is one of the hosts of the talk show Papo de Segunda on GNT, alongside Marcelo Tas, Léo Jaime and Xico Sá.

Personal life
Castro married actress Cléo Pires in 2010. They divorced in 2012. From 2013 to 2015 he dated television presenter Sabrina Sato.

Filmography

Film
 2014: A Noite da Virada – Rica
 2016: Porta dos Fundos: Contrato Vitalício – Luciano
 2016: Sausage Party – José Tequila (voice only)

Television
 2012: O Fantástico Mundo de Gregório – himself
 2013: A Mulher do Prefeito – Liosvaldo
 2014: Lili, a Ex – Reinaldo
 2015–2016: O Grande Gonzalez – Walter
 2016–2017: Rock Story – Lázaro Vasconcelos

References

External links
 
 
 

1983 births
Living people
Brazilian male film actors
Brazilian male television actors
Brazilian male comedians
Brazilian humorists
Brazilian male telenovela actors
Brazilian male voice actors
Brazilian television presenters
21st-century Brazilian male actors
Male actors from Rio de Janeiro (city)